Oxypselaphus is a genus of beetle in the family Carabidae, that contains the following species:
Oxypselaphus dominici Brandmayr & Zetto Brandmayr, 1984
Oxypselaphus obscurus (Herbst, 1784)
Oxypselaphus pusillus (Leconte, 1854)
Oxypselaphus thielei Brandmayr & Zetto Brandmayr, 1984

References

Platyninae